Asani Samuels (born 20 March 1992) is a Jamaican professional footballer.

Career

College & Youth
Samuels played four years of college soccer at Canisius College between 2011 and 2014.

Samuels also made 10 appearances for NPSL club FC Buffalo in 2013, scoring one goal.

Professional
Samuels joined United Soccer League club Rochester Rhinos on 27 March 2015.

Samuels won the MVP at the conclusion of the 2015 USL Championship as he scored twice (90+1, 113') to help the Rochester Rhinos secure the USL title.

Honors
United Soccer League
USL Championship
Winner : 2015
USL Regular Season 
Winner: 2015
USL Eastern Conference (Playoffs)
Winner: 2015
USL Eastern Conference (Regular Season)
Winner: 2015

References

External links 
 Soccerway profile

1992 births
Living people
Jamaican footballers
Rochester New York FC players
Association football forwards
USL Championship players
Expatriate soccer players in the United States
Jamaican expatriate footballers
FC Buffalo players
Canisius Golden Griffins men's soccer players